Sibby is a given name or nickname.

Notable people with the name include:

 Sibby Flowers (born 1963), American weightlifter
 Sibby Nichols (1884–1957), Canadian ice-hockey player
 Sibby Sisti (1920–2006), American baseball player
 Sibimet ("Sibby"), a character in the Sylvie and Bruno novels by Lewis Carroll

See also
 Siby (disambiguation)